The 19th century saw Jews, like many other people, moving to the American West.

Early history of Jewish congregations and community

San Francisco, California 

In 1849, the first Jewish service of San Francisco began as a minyan at Lewis Abraham Franklin's tent store on Jackson Street at Kearny Street, with 30 Jews from Poland, Prussia, Bavaria and the Eastern United States, and was initially Orthodox. There have been ethnic and class differences within the Jewish community in San Francisco, which has spawned dispute on the earliest of history. In 1851, Congregation Emanu-El and Congregation Sherith Israel of San Francisco were joined as a single synagogue; but soon after they split into two congregations. 

Congregation Emanu-El was mostly Bavarian German immigrants, and Congregation Sherith Israel was mostly immigrants from Eastern Europe, Poland, and England. 

By 1855, Congregation Emanu-El shifted from Orthodox to Liberal Judaism. In 1860, a Reform rabbi, Elkan Cohn, arrived to lead the Emanu-El congregation, and in 1877, it was the first congregation in the West to join the Reform movement. From 1866 to 1926, Congregation Emanu-El's synagogue was on Sutter Street, it was grand in scale and had twin octagonal towers topped by bronze-plated domes.

Los Angeles, California

San Diego, California 

Lewis Abraham Franklin moved from San Francisco to San Diego in 1851, and that fall he organized the first High Holiday services in Southern California. During the first services in Southern California, Franklin was joined by Mark Israel Jacobs and Charles A. Fletcher.

Portland, Oregon 
Jacob Goldsmith and Lewis May were the earliest Jews settling in Portland, Oregon; in 1849 the two German-born immigrants established a general store in the city. Despite having an early arrive in the state of Oregon, it took almost a decade to establish a synagogue in the state. The first synagogue built in 1861 by Congregation Beth Israel in Portland. In 1869, a second synagogue was built for Congregation Ahavai Sholom also of Portland.

Jewish politicians
There were over 30 Jewish mayors in the late 1800s and early 1900s.

California 
Adolph Sutro, a Jewish tradesman from Prussia, ran as the "Anti-Octopus" candidate and served one term as the Mayor of San Francisco in 1895 to 1897. 

The first Jewish congresswoman in the United States was Florence Kahn, who represented California's 4th district succeeding her husband Julius Kahn when he died in the middle of his 12th term. In addition to being a congresswoman, she taught English and history to high school students. She was involved in many Jewish organizations and motivated women across California to participate in politics.

Oregon 
In 1869, Bernard Goldsmith, an immigrant Jew from Bavaria, became the mayor of Portland, Oregon.

Idaho 
Charles Himrod served as mayor of Boise, Idaho Territory, for two terms in the 1860s and 1870s. Moses Alexander was the second person elected Jewish governor of a US state, serving as the 11th Governor of Idaho from 1915 until 1919.

Utah 
Simon Bamberger was the third Jewish governor of a US State and the first non-Mormon to be elected Governor of Utah, serving as the 4th Governor of Utah (1917–1921) after it achieved statehood in 1896.

Modern day

Today, California has one of the largest Jewish-American populations at about 1 million, and the state's main Jewish communities are found in Los Angeles (especially western parts of the city such as Westwood and Beverly Hills) and the San Francisco Bay Area (especially San Francisco and Berkeley). Recent Russian Jewish immigrants are settling in urban Jewish communities, such as the state capital of Sacramento and a smaller Jewish community in Palm Springs.

See also
Judaism in Oregon

References

Jews
West